The McKee Botanical Garden (area of 18 acres (7.3 hectares)) is a non-profit, subtropical botanical garden in Vero Beach, Florida. It is located at 350 U.S. Highway 1, Vero Beach, Florida.

History
It was founded in 1929, when Waldo E. Sexton and Arthur G. McKee purchased an  tropical hammock along the Indian River. Tropical landscape architect William Lyman Phillips was hired to design its streams, ponds, and trails.  Its indigenous vegetation was augmented with ornamental plants and seeds from around the world.  In 1932, they proceeded to open the garden, then known as McKee Jungle Gardens, as a tourist attraction. Although the Garden was successful for several decades, it shut down in 1976, and most of its land was sold for development. The site remained vacant for twenty years until the Indian River Land Trust purchased it in 1995.  The current Garden was formally dedicated in 2001. It is now a Florida landmark and on January 7, 1998, it was added to the U.S. National Register of Historic Places under its former name of McKee Jungle Gardens. Currently, there are several buildings on the garden including the office, gift shop, education center and a restaurant.

Flora
The Garden's collections currently include:
 
 Adenium obesum
 Aechmea 'Blue Tango'
 Aechmea leuddemanniana 'Mend'
 Aechmea pineliana var. minuta
 Aechmea 'Li'l Harvey'
 Aleurites moluccana
 Alpina purpurata 'Eileen McDonald'
 Alpinia calcarata
 Alpinia zerumbet
 Ananas comosus
 Annona glabra
 Annona muricata
 Anthurium 'White Gemini'
 Ardisia crenata
 Ardisia escallononioides
 Aristolochia gigantea
 Aristolochia grandiflora
 Asclepias species
 Bambusa chungii
 Barleria micans
 Bauhinia punctata
 Bauhinia species
 Begonia 'Beefsteak'
 Belamcanda chinensis
 Billbergia species
 Bixa orellana
 Bromelia pinguin
 Brugmansia species
 Brunfelsia jamaicensis
 Caladium 'Aaron'
 Caladium 'Florida Starburst'
 Caladium 'Florida Sweet Heart'
 Caladium 'Freda Hemple'
 Caladium 'Ginger Land'
 Caladium 'June Bride'
 Caladium 'White Queen'
 Caldium 'Scarlet Pimpernel'
 Calliandra haematocephala
 Callicarpa americana
 Callicarpa americana alba
 Canna species
 Carica papaya
 Chamaedorea tepejilote
 Citharexylum spinosum
 Clerodendron fairchildianum 'Musical Note'
 Clerodendron speciosissimum
 Clerodendrum bungii
 Clerodendrum quadriloculare
 Clerodendrum thomsoniae
 Clerodendrum ugandense
 Clivia species
 Congea tomentosa
 Cordia lutea
 Cordia boissieri
 Costus barbatus
 Crinum americanum
 Crinum asiaticum
 Crinum species (dwarf)
 Curculigo capitulate
 Curcuma species
 Delonix regia
 Dendrobium × hybrid
 Dichromena species
 Dombeya wallichii
 Dracaena fragrans
 Epidendrum 'Kauai Sunrise'
 Eucalyptus deglupta
 Ficus benghalensis
 Ficus natalensis leprieurii
 Gigantochloa pseudoarundidacea
 Glandularia tampensis
 Grewia caffra
 Habranthus brachyandrus
 Hamelia cuprea
 Hamelia macrantha
 Hamelia patens
 Hedychium gardnerianum
 Heliconia rostrata
 Hibiscus coccineus
 Hibiscus rosa-sinensis
 Hoya carnosa
 Ipomoea carnea
 Jacquemontia penthantha
 Jatropha podagrica
 Justicia species
 Kaempferi pulchara
 Laelia pacavia
 Lagerstroemia speciosa
 Lantana trifolia
 Lonicera sempervirens
 Megaskepas erythrochlamys
 Mussaenda 'Dona Aurora'
 Myrsine guianensis
 Nelumbo 'Mrs. Perry Slocum'
 Nelumbo species
  Nymphaea species
 Odentatum stricta
 Oxalis 'Montana'
 Passiflora citrine
 Passiflora hahnii
 Passiflora species
 Passiflora × violacea
 Pentas lanceolata
 Petrea volubilis
 Phoenix hybrid
 Plumbago scandens
 Plumeria species
 Podranea ricasoliana
 Pseuderanthemum alatum
 Pseudobombax ellipticum
 Rondeletia leucophylla
 Ruellia brittoniana
 Russelia equisetiformis
 Russelia sarmentosa
 Sagittaria lancifolia
 Stachytarpheta urticifolia
 Vachellia farnesiana
 Victoria cruziana.

See also 
 List of botanical gardens in the United States

References

External links

 
 Indian River County listings at National Register of Historic Places

Botanical gardens in Florida
National Register of Historic Places in Indian River County, Florida
Buildings and structures in Vero Beach, Florida
Parks in Indian River County, Florida